Isanda murrea is a species of sea snail, a marine gastropod mollusc in the family Trochidae, the top snails.

Description
It is a minute turbinate, porcelaneous shell, with narrow umbilicus, its margin crenated. It is smooth, polished, white neatly blotched with pale rose.

Distribution
This marine species occurs off Japan.

References

 Higo, S., Callomon, P. & Goto, Y. (1999) Catalogue and Bibliography of the Marine Shell-Bearing Mollusca of Japan. Elle Scientific Publications, Yao, Japan, 749 pp.

murrea
Gastropods described in 1848